The Lawrence Allen Centre, formerly Lawrence Square Shopping Centre, is a shopping centre located in Toronto, Ontario, Canada. Owned by RioCan, it is one of the city's twenty largest malls. It is located on Lawrence Avenue West, west of Allen Road, in the neighbourhood of Lawrence Heights, the district of North York. It is accessible from the Toronto Transit Commission's Lawrence West station, as well as via various bus routes. It is a terminating vista of Marlee Avenue. North of Lawrence Allen Centre is the Yorkdale Shopping Centre.

Tenants
The anchor stores are Canadian Tire on the west side and Fortinos (Loblaw Companies Limited) on the northwest side. There was a Zellers on the east side, which became vacant in early 2013. There were plans to have Target Canada where Zellers was, albeit in a smaller format, but it was scrapped upon Target's exit from Canada and space remained vacant until April 14, 2016 when Marshalls and HomeSense (both owned by TJX Companies) and PetSmart moved in.

Payless ShoeSource was located in the lower floor next to main front entrance before it went out of business as a victim of the retail apocalypse. Its location has since been replaced with a BMO branch and a Pizzaville location.

Other major tenants include Dollarama, The Source, Showcase, Structube, and Toys "R" Us Express (the lattermost of which is the successor to the former Toys "R" Us location at Yonge Eglinton Centre, also owned and operated by RioCan).

Renovations

When Zellers became defunct, there were renovations in its former space from 2015 to 2016 to accommodate Marshalls, HomeSense, and PetSmart.

Lawrence Square's redevelopment began in September 2017 and was completed in phases by the end of 2018. The transformation consisted of the two levels of retail, the expansion of the food court, and new public washrooms.

Lawrence Square Shopping Centre was renamed as Lawrence Allen Centre on October 3, 2019.

Site redevelopment

Old plan
As part of the 20-year plan to redevelop Lawrence Heights that began in 2007 by local city councillor Howard Moscoe, Lawrence Square was planned to be demolished to make way for a northward extension of Marlee Avenue and for public housing.

Two nearby public schools were planned to be demolished to make way for retail uses.

New plan
Later on, councillor Moscoe retired. The new councillor, Josh Colle, conducted more rounds of community consultation. The city no longer aims to demolish Lawrence Square; instead, the new plan is to leave the mall in place for good.

See also

Lawrence Plaza
List of shopping malls in Toronto

References

External links

Shopping malls in Toronto
North York
Shopping malls established in 1989
Terminating vistas in Canada
1989 establishments in Ontario